Ghost Loop is a television series that premiered on the Travel Channel in January 2020. The show features Matt Lytle, Eric Vitale, Chris Califf, Kris Star, and Sean Austin all of whom attempt to investigate alleged paranormal activity within households.

See also

 2020 in American television

References

2020 American television series debuts
Travel Channel original programming